James McCurdy "Rabbit" Miller (October 2, 1880 – February 7, 1937) was a Major League Baseball infielder for the New York Giants in 1901.

References

External links

1880 births
1937 deaths
New York Giants (NL) players
Major League Baseball second basemen
Baseball players from Pennsylvania
Binghamton Bingoes players
Toronto Maple Leafs (International League) players
San Francisco Seals (baseball) players
Montreal Royals players
Canton Watchmakers players
New Castle Nocks players
Uniontown Coal Barons players
Lawrence Colts players